Ambato Canton is a canton of Ecuador, located in the Tungurahua Province.  Its capital is the city of Ambato.  Its population at the 2011 census was 387,282.

The Ambato canton is known as the canton of "Fruits and Flowers" because of its agricultural activities.  Annually in February, this canton holds a Fruits and Flowers festival

References

 

Cantons of Tungurahua Province